As a nickname, Monk or The Monk may refer to:

 Monk Boudreaux (born 1941), American singer and R&B musician
 Monk Cline (1858–1916), American baseball player
 Monk Dubiel (1918–1969), American Major League Baseball pitcher
 Monk Eastman (1875–1920), founder and leader of a powerful New York City gang
 Mark "Monk" Hubbard (1970–2018), American skateboarder, skatepark builder, artist, and founder of Grindline Skateparks
 Gerry Hutch (born 1963), Irish bank robber known as "The Monk"
 Antonin Magne (1904–1983), French cyclist who won the Tour de France in 1931 and 1934, nicknamed "The Monk"
 Edward Malloy (born 1941), 16th president of the University of Notre Dame
 Monk McDonald (1901–1977), American college athlete, head basketball coach and urologist
 Monk Montgomery (1921–1982), American jazz bassist
 Monk Sherlock (1904–1985), American Major League Baseball player in the 1930 season
 Claude Simons, Sr. (1887–1943), American sports coach at Tulane University
 Monk Williams (1945–2003), American football player

See also 

 Claude Simons, Jr. (1914–1975), American college athlete and football, basketball and baseball coach at Tulane University, son of Claude Simons, Sr., known as "Little Monk"

Lists of people by nickname